Sir Ciarán Gearoid Devane  (born 25 October 1962) is the executive director of the Centre for Trust, Peace and Social Relations (CTPSR) and associate pro-vice-chancellor for international relations at Coventry University (appointed April 2021). Previously he was chief executive of the British Council (appointed January 2015). He is also chairperson of the Health Service Executive.

Education
Devane was educated at University College Dublin, where he read for a BEng in biochemical engineering. He also holds a master's degree in international policy and practice from the George Washington University's Elliott School of International Affairs.

Career
Devane worked as chief executive at Macmillan Cancer Support from 2007 to 2014. He was appointed chief executive of the British Council in January 2015. As of 2015, Devane was paid a salary of between £185,000 and £189,999 by the Foreign Office, making him one of the 328 most highly paid people in the British public sector at that time. He also serves as a non-executive director of NHS England.
Devane was appointed to Coventry University in April 2021.  

Devane was knighted in the 2015 Birthday Honours for services to cancer patients.

Devane was announced as the first chairperson of the new board of the Irish health service, the Health Service Executive (HSE) by Minister for Health, Simon Harris on 18 September 2018.

Arms

See also
British Council
Macmillan Cancer Support

References

Living people
Knights Bachelor
Alumni of University College Dublin
Elliott School of International Affairs alumni
1962 births
People of the British Council